Alexandre García (born 16 February 1972) is a Brazilian judoka. He competed in the men's extra-lightweight event at the 1996 Summer Olympics.

References

External links
 

1972 births
Living people
Brazilian male judoka
Olympic judoka of Brazil
Judoka at the 1996 Summer Olympics
Sportspeople from Porto Alegre